George Tamunoiyowuna Kurubo (27 July 1934 – 2000) was Nigerian Air Force's Chief of the Air Staff from 1966 to 1967. Brigadier George T Kurubo was the third Commander of the Nigerian Air Force (NAF), the first indigenous to hold the post. 
He was married, had four children, visited the Government School in Bonny.

Education
From 1948 to 1953, Kurubo attended Government College in Umuahia, then Regular Officers' Training School in Accra in 1953, then Officer Cadets Training School, Eaton Hall, Cheshire in 1954. From 1954 to 1955, he attended Royal Military Academy Sandhurst, then the Young Air Infantry Officers' School in 1956, then Senior Air Infantry Officers' School in 1961, and finally Command and Staff College, Quetta, Pakistan in 1964.

Career
Kurubo was promoted second lieutenant and then platoon commander in 1956. Between 1957 and 1965, her served in various command positions. In 1964, he moved from Lt-Col in the Army to the newly formed Nigerian Air Force in 1964. In January 1966, he became the first indigenous Air Force Chief.

An Easterner, he did not go with the Igbo-led secession because he was from Rivers State which was carved out of the Eastern Region at the outbreak of the Nigerian Civil War. Serving as the Eastern commander of logistics, Kurubo defected from Biafra to the Federal Government.

From January–July 1966, Kurubo served as a member of the Supreme Military Council, and as a member of the Federal Executive Council.

On 12 August 1967, he was appointed Nigeria's Ambassador to the Soviet Union, where he stayed until 1973. In 1970, he was promoted to Brigadier General.

From  until 1975, Kurubo served as Nigeria's ambassador to Iran, also accredited to Ankara.

On , Kurubo retired from the military

Political career

In 1977, he served as chairman of the Bonny Local Government Area's Management Committee. Then, from 1977 to 1978, he was a member of the Constituent Assembly of the Second Nigerian Republic.

Kurubo died in 2000.

References

1934 births
2000 deaths
Nigerian Air Force officers
Ambassadors of Nigeria to the Soviet Union
Ambassadors of Nigeria to Turkey
People from Bonny
20th-century Nigerian politicians
Ambassadors of Nigeria to Iran
Graduates of the Royal Military Academy Sandhurst
Rivers State military personnel
Chiefs of the Air Staff (Nigeria)
Government College Umuahia alumni